Endocrine Reviews is a bimonthly peer-reviewed academic journal for review articles in endocrinology published by the Endocrine Society. Its 2016 impact factor is 15.745.According to the Journal Citation Reports, the journal has a 2016 impact factor of 0.506.

References

Endocrinology journals